The Great City Synagogue was a synagogue in the city of Lviv (Polish: Lwów, German: Lemberg) in what is now Ukraine. It was situated in the former Jewish Quarter near today's city centre.

History

Earlier synagogues 

The first synagogue in Lviv was situated nearby in  29, Feodorova Street. It was a wooden building that was built around 1320. In 1527 a catastrophic fire destroyed parts of the city including the synagogue.

A new synagogue in the Gothic style was constructed  in 54, Staroyevreiska Street in 1555. It served as the Great City Synagogue. Because it was a small building, in 1606, the role of the Great City Synagogue shifted to the Golden Rose Synagogue. When this synagogue was becoming too small as well, the Jewish community began to construct a new, considerably bigger, synagogue on the site of the disassembled old synagogue, between 1799 and 1801.

New building 
The construction of the new synagogue took place between 1799 and 1801. It was built in Neoclassicist style. After the Jewish Community transferred the reliquaries from the Golden Rose Synagogue to the newly constructed synagogue in 1801, the latter became the main city synagogue.

It underwent some repairs and reconstructions until World War II. Nearly all of Lviv's synagogues were destroyed by the Nazis; this one was blown up in 1943.

See also 
 List of synagogues in Ukraine

References

External links 

 The Space of Synagogues

Former synagogues in Ukraine
Synagogues in Lviv
Religious buildings and structures completed in 1801
19th-century synagogues
Synagogues destroyed by Nazi Germany
Buildings and structures demolished in 1943
Neoclassical synagogues
Synagogues completed in 1801